Kuniyamuthur is a part of South Coimbatore.  It is about 6 km from Coimbatore City center in the South. Kuniyamuthur is sometimes spelled Kuniamuthur or Kunimattoor.  It is one of the busiest markets in the city. It is located on Palakkad road, one of arterial roads of Coimbatore city.  The Coimbatore International Airport is about 17 km and Coimbatore Junction is about 6 km from here, Podanur Junction railway station is about 5 km from Kuniyamuthur. As of 2011, the town had a population of 95,924.

Demographics

According to 2011 census, Kuniyamuthur had a population of 95,924 with a sex-ratio of 1,001 females for every 1,000 males, much above the national average of 929. A total of 10,119 were under the age of six, constituting 5,158 males and 4,961 females. Scheduled Castes and Scheduled Tribes accounted for 10.08% and .06% of the population respectively. The average literacy of the town was 79.95%, compared to the national average of 72.99%. The town had a total of  25270 households. There were a total of 38,386 workers, comprising 230 cultivators, 642 main agricultural labourers, 809 in house hold industries, 34,566 other workers, 2,139 marginal workers, 34 marginal cultivators, 60 marginal agricultural labourers, 85 marginal workers in household industries and 1,960 other marginal workers.

As per the religious census of 2011, Kuniyamuthur had 72.03% Hindus, 20.85% Muslims, 6.95% Christians, 0.01% Sikhs, 0.01% Buddhists, 0.02% Jains, 0.11% following other religions and 0.01% following no religion or did not indicate any religious preference.

Politics
Vellalore is a part of Thondamuthur (state assembly constituency) and Pollachi (Lok Sabha constituency).

References

Neighbourhoods in Coimbatore